PPCI may refer to:

 Primary percutaneous coronary intervention, a cardiac medical procedure (sometimes "pPCI")
 Progressive Party of Côte d'Ivoire, a political party between 1946 and 1951
 Partially premixed charge compression ignition, in diesel engines